The Peter Culverhouse Memorial Trust (PCMT) is a charitable trust in the United Kingdom. It was established to raise money for research into brain tumours, and to help finance care for terminally ill cancer patients.

Establishing

The PCMT was founded in memory of Peter Culverhouse, of Bookham in Surrey, who died of a brain tumour in October 2003 at the age of 31.

Beneficiaries

The PCMT uses its donations and its endowment income to support two charities. 

The Princess Alice Hospice in Esher, Surrey provides care for terminally ill cancer payment, offers support to their relatives, and provides education for health care professionals. Half of the PCMT's donations are given to support their activities.

The PCMT's trustees wished to try to support research into low grade Gliomas. To that end, the trust donates half of its income into the SDBTT Astro Fund, to finance research specifically in this area. Along with other, similar charities the PCMT offers support to research led by Dr. Jeremy Rees.

Operation

The PCMT is a charitable trust that is administered by the Charities Aid Foundation (a registered charity in the United Kingdom). The activities of the PCMT are overseen by the four trustees: Nick Crossley, Paul Donovan, Tom Humphreys and Mark Shepherd.

External links
The Peter Culverhouse Memorial Trust

Charities based in Surrey
Health charities in the United Kingdom